The atv98 channel (Asamblea TV) is a cable television channel from Nicaragua, similar to C-SPAN, owned and operated by the Nicaraguan Parliament. It features live coverage of the legislative power.

External links 
 

Television stations in Nicaragua
Spanish-language television stations